Seo Jung-hyup (born 3 January 1965) is a South Korean educator and politician served as the acting mayor of Seoul since 10 July 2020 to 8 April 2021, and has been Deputy Mayor for Administration of Seoul since 2020. Prior to becoming Deputy Mayor, Seo served as the head of the Seoul Metropolitan Government's cultural department. He has been the acting mayor of Seoul following the death of Mayor Park Won-soon.

Early years and studies

Seo Jung-hyup was born and raised in Ulsan. After graduating from Hakseong High School in 1983, Seo moved to Seoul to complete his post secondary studies.

Seo studied international economics at Seoul National University (BA), as well as public administration at University of Seoul (MA), Korea National Open University (MA as well as BA in English and Literature), Harvard University's Kennedy School in Public Administration (MA)

Academic and municipal career
Following his completion of administrative exams in 1991, Seo has worked at various positions within the Seoul Metropolitan City Government, as well as adjunct professor at various universities in Seoul (Korea University, Hanyang University, Yonsei University).

He became Deputy Mayor in January 2020 and Acting Mayor on 10 July 2020.

References 

1965 births
Living people
Seoul National University alumni
University of Seoul alumni
Harvard Kennedy School alumni
21st-century South Korean politicians